Upuna is a monotypic genus of plants containing the single species Upuna borneensis. The genus name Upana is derived from its Iban name, upan. The species name borneensis refers to its distribution, being found only in Borneo. It is native to lowland mixed dipterocarp forests up to 400 meters elevation. It is a heavy hardwood similar to Vatica. While Upuna borneensis occurs in protected areas, it is threatened by logging, expansion of palm oil plantations and increasing frequency of fires.

References

Dipterocarpaceae
Monotypic Malvales genera
Endemic flora of Borneo
Trees of Borneo
Flora of the Borneo lowland rain forests
Taxonomy articles created by Polbot